Cihad Kepenek (born 1 October 1993) is a Turkish kickboxer, currently competing in the heavyweight division of kickboxing promotion Glory.

Kickboxing career
Kepenek made his promotional debut with Glory against Tomáš Možný at Glory 29: Copenhagen on April 16, 2016. He lost the fight by unanimous decision, after an extra fourth round was contested.

Kepenek was booked to face Yurii Gorbenko at Prestige Fights 2 on September 30, 2016. He won the fight by unanimous decision.

Kepenek faced Junior Tafa at Glory 65: Utrecht on May 17, 2019. He won the fight by unanimous decision.

Kepenek faced Sergio Pique at World Fight Night on April 14, 2018. He lost the fight by unanimous decision.

Kepenek was scheduled to fight Nordine Mahieddine at Glory Collision 2 on December 21, 2019. He lost the fight by split decision, after an extra round was fought.

Kepenek challenged the reigning ISKA Muaythai World Super Heavyweight champion Thomas Froschauer at Army of Fighters 1 on July 10, 2021. He won the fight by a first-round knockout.

Kepenek was booked to rematch Nordine Mahieddine at Glory 81: Ben Saddik vs. Adegbuyi 2 on August 20, 2022. He won the fight by first-round knockout.

Failed drug test

GLORY 81
The result was overturned to a no contest on November 24, as Kepenek tested positive for a banned substance. He was also suspended for 12 months.

Championships and accomplishments
International Sport Kickboxing Association
 2021 ISKA Muaythai World Super Heavyweight Champion

Kickboxing record

|-  bgcolor="#c5d2ea"
| 2022-08-20 || NC || align="left" | Nordine Mahieddine || Glory 81: Ben Saddik vs. Adegbuyi 2 || Düsseldorf, Germany || No Contest (Overturned) || 1 || 2:52
|-
! style=background:white colspan=9 |
|-  bgcolor="#cfc"
| 2021-07-10 || Win|| align="left" | Thomas Froschauer || Army of Fighters 1 || Istanbul, Turkey || KO (Punches) || 1 || 2:25  
|-
! style=background:white colspan=9 |

|-  bgcolor="#fbb"
| 2019-12-21 || Loss ||align=left| Nordine Mahieddine || Glory Collision 2 || Arnhem, Netherlands || Ext. R Decision (Split) || 4 || 3:00

|- style="background:#cfc;"
|2019-05-17
|Win
|style="text-align:left;"| Junior Tafa 
|Glory 65: Utrecht
| Utrecht, Netherlands
| Decision (Unanimous) 
|3
|3:00

|-  style="background:#fbb;"
| 2018-04-14 || Loss || align="left" | Sergio Pique || World Fight Night || Gebze, Istanbul || Decision (Unanimous) || 3 || 3:00

|-  style="background:#cfc;"
| 2017-10-21|| Win||align=left| Tasos Karagiandis || Orion Fight Arena || Ankara, Turkey || TKO (Punches)|| 1 ||

|-  style="background:#cfc;"
| 2016-09-30|| Win||align=left| Yuri Gorbenko || Prestige Fights 2 || Cyprus || Decision (Unanimous)|| 3 || 3:00

|-  style="background:#fbb;"
| 2016-04-16 || Loss || align="left" | Tomáš Možný || Glory 29: Copenhagen || Copenhagen, Denmark || Ext. R. Decision (Unanimous) || 4 || 3:00

|- style="background:#fbb;"
| 2016-02-28 || Loss ||align=left| Levi Rigters ||  Anadolu Arena 9 || Tokat, Turkey ||Decision || 3 || 3:00

|-  style="background:#fbb;"
| 2013-12-04 || Loss ||align=left| Paul Slowinski || A1 World Grand Prix 2013 || Melbourne || TKO (Punches) || 1 || 2:53

|- style="background:#fbb;"
| 2013-06-03
| Loss
| align=left| Patrice Quarteron
| A-1 World Combat Cup
| Istanbul, Turkey
| Decision (Unanimous)
| 3
| 3:00

|-  style="background:#cfc;"
| 2013-08-13|| Win||align=left| Hamed Allouche || A1  || Melbourne, Australia || TKO (Punches)|| 1 ||

|-  style="background:#cfc;"
| 2012-09-|| Win||align=left| Harun Ozgun || Prestige Fights 2 || Turkey || KO (Right hook)|| 1 ||

|-
| colspan=9 | Legend:

See also
 List of male kickboxers

References

Living people
Turkish male kickboxers
Heavyweight kickboxers
1993 births
Glory kickboxers
Doping cases in kickboxing
Turkish sportspeople in doping cases